Perry Island is an island about  east of Cape Grenville in the Great Barrier Reef Marine Park Queensland, Australia, in Temple Bay about  north-east of Kutini-Payamu National Park and Lockhart River in the Cape York Peninsula. It is around 7 hectares or 0.07 square km in size.

This island is part of Home Islands.

See also

 List of islands of Australia

References

Islands on the Great Barrier Reef
Places in the Great Barrier Reef Marine Park